Slovenly were an American post-punk band from San Francisco, California, formed in 1981. After the group disbanded, Tom Watson joined Red Krayola for their self-titled album and has continued to record with them.

History
The members of Slovenly had all attended Mira Costa High School in Manhattan Beach. Steve Anderson, Scott Ziegler and drummer Bruce Lossen were in a band called the Convalescence. When the bass player left, Watson joined and the band name was changed to Toxic Shock.

After graduation, they continued playing music and the initial version of Slovenly was formed. Eventually, Bruce left the band and was replaced by ex-Saccharine Trust drummer Rob Holzman.

The band played their first gig as Toxic Shock with Minutemen and Saccharine Trust which led to an invitation from the Urinals to contribute a track to the Keats Rides A Harley compilation album by Happy Squid Records. The band changed their name to Slovenly and continued to gig with Minutemen which lead to releasing their first albums on Mike Watt's New Alliance Records label.

Discography 
Studio albums
After the Original Style (1984, New Alliance)
Thinking of Empire (1986, SST)
Riposte (1987, SST)
We Shoot for the Moon (1989, SST)
Highway to Hanno's (1992, SST)

EPs
Even So (1984, New Alliance)

References

External links 
 
 

American noise rock music groups
American post-punk music groups
Indie rock musical groups from California
Musical groups disestablished in 1992
Musical groups established in 1981
Musical groups from San Francisco
SST Records artists